Gonal is a village in the southern state of Karnataka, India. Administratively, Gonal is under Herur gram panchayat, Gangavathi Taluka of Koppal District in Karnataka.   The village of Gonal is  3 km by road southeast of the village of Herur and 5.6 km by road north of the town of Gangawati.

Notes

External links 
 

Villages in Koppal district